Paul Mullen (born 16 November 1991) is an Irish-American rugby union player who plays prop for the Utah Warriors of Major League Rugby (MLR) and the United States men's national team. Mullen previously played for the Houston SaberCats, the San Diego Legion and the Newcastle Falcons.

Early life
Mullen is originally from the Aran Islands, Galway, Ireland. He first played rugby at the age of 13, while attending the Glenstal Abbey School. Mullen played rugby there from 2004 until 2009. Mullen also attended school at The King's Hospital, playing rugby there from 2009 until 2010.

Mullen also played age-grade rugby for Munster before moving to the United States to attend Texas A&M University. There, Mullen earned his bachelor's degree in marine engineering technology in 2015 and his master's degree in marine resources management in 2017. While living in Texas, Mullen  played Gaelic Football with the Houston Gaels   while at the same time he continued to play amateur rugby and also became a referee with the Texas Rugby Union. He is the brother of Irish racing cyclist Eoin Mullen.

Club career
Mullen signed with the Houston SaberCats for Major League Rugby's inaugural 2018 season. Mullen made his debut with the SaberCats on 19 May 2018, starting at tighthead prop in the SaberCats' 24–20 loss to the New Orleans Gold.

In August 2018, Mullen signed a four-month contract to play for the Newcastle Falcons in England's Premiership Rugby.

Following a short stint in England, Mullen signed a one year deal with the Houston Sabercats.

After the 2019 Rugby World Cup in Japan, Mullen signed for San Diego Legion for the 2020 season.

International career

USA Junior All-Americans
Mullen made his debut representing the United States playing for the United States men's national under-20 team (Junior All-Americans) in the 2011 IRB Junior World Rugby Trophy, scoring a crucial try against Zimbabwe.

USA Eagles
In May 2018, Mullen was selected for the USA Eagles' roster for the 2018 mid-year tests. Mullen made his debut for USA Eagles on 9 June 2018, starting at prop in a 62–13 victory against . Mullen is qualified to represent the United States at the international level on account of having an American grandparent.

Rugby World Cup 
Mullen was selected to represent the USA Eagles in the 2019 Rugby World Cup in Japan. Mullen played in all four pool games against England, France, Argentina and Tonga.

References

External links
itsrugby.co.uk Profile

1991 births
Living people
American rugby union players
Irish rugby union players
United States international rugby union players
Rugby union props
Houston SaberCats players
Newcastle Falcons players
Doncaster Knights players
San Diego Legion players
Utah Warriors players